Ryan Spain (born October 11, 1982) is a Republican member of the Illinois House of Representatives, representing the 73rd district which includes Bureau, Marshall, Peoria, Stark and Woodford counties in west central Illinois.

Early life and career
At age 24, Spain was elected an at-large member of the Peoria City Council. He was sworn in May 1, 2007. On October 5, 2016, Spain announced his resignation from the City Council with an effective date of November 18, 2016.

Spain has undergraduate degrees in political science and speech communications from the University of Illinois at Urbana-Champaign, and an M.B.A. from Bradley University. Prior to his service in the Illinois House, Spain was Vice President of Government Relations at OSF HealthCare, which included serving as one of OSF Healthcare's lobbyists on Capitol Hill. As of 2020, Spain is Vice President of Economic Development with OSF.

State legislature
On February 11, 2021, Minority Leader Jim Durkin announced that Spain would be leading the House Republican Organization, the campaign arm of Republican candidates running for the Illinois House of Representatives, for the 2022 general election.

As of July 3, 2022, Representative Spain is a member of the following Illinois House committees:

 Appropriations - Human Services Committee (HAPH)
 Business & Innovation Subcommittee (HLBR-BUIN)
 Ethics & Elections Committee (SHEE)
 Executive Committee (HEXC)
 Financial Institutions Committee (HFIN)
 Labor & Commerce Committee (HLBR)
 Prescription Drug Affordability Committee (HPDA)
 Redistricting Committee (HRED)
 Tourism Committee (SHTO)

References

External links
 Profile at Illinois General Assembly

1982 births
Living people
21st-century American politicians
Republican Party members of the Illinois House of Representatives
University of Illinois alumni
People from Henry County, Illinois
Peoria, Illinois City Council members